Grm is a small village in the Municipality of Trebnje in eastern Slovenia. The area is part of the historical region of Lower Carniola. The municipality is now included in the Southeast Slovenia Statistical Region.

The local church is dedicated to Saint Margaret and belongs to the Parish of Trebnje. It is a 15th-century church with major 17th-century remodelling in the Baroque style.

References

External links
Grm at Geopedia

Populated places in the Municipality of Trebnje